Eurodoc, the European Council for Doctoral Candidates and Junior Researchers, is an international federation of national associations of doctoral candidates and early career researchers (pre-doctoral or post-doctoral researchers employed on a temporary basis) of the European Union and the Council of Europe.

History
The initiative for the first conference, held in 2001, was taken by the Doktorandnämnden of Uppsala Student Union, who organized the conference together with SweDoc, i.e. the Swedish association of doctoral candidates.  Eurodoc was subsequently founded in Girona, Spain on 2 February 2002. Eurodoc was legally established in 2005 in Brussels as an international non-profit organisation.

In a meeting of ministers responsible for higher education in Berlin in 2003, doctoral programmes were first mentioned in the Bologna Process setting. Since then, Eurodoc has been playing an active role in pertinent Bologna seminars and projects. Its involvement in the Bologna Process has been formally acknowledged in 2007 by the formal status of "partner" to the Bologna Process follow-up group. In addition, Eurodoc has been involved and provided input for the European Higher Education Area and the European Research Area.

Eurodoc Conferences and Annual General Meetings 

Each year (generally in spring), Eurodoc convenes an international conference. This conference aims to provide a framework for doctoral candidates and junior researchers to meet with European political and economic leaders and to engage in a fruitful discussion on the construction of the European Research and Higher Education Area. Conferences are usually followed by an Annual General Meeting (AGM), Eurodoc’s highest decision-making body.

Conference & AGM 2021 in Prague, Czech Republic 
The Eurodoc Conference 2021 was held in Prague on 14-15 July 2021 in a hybrid form to bring together as many people as the pandemic situation allowed while streaming it online. The event was organised by the Committee for Doctoral Education under the Student Chamber of the Council of Higher Education Institutions (SK RVŠ) from the Czech Republic and Eurodoc. The conference focused on the quality and appropriate conditions of doctoral training and career development with the title: "Improving Doctoral Training in Europe."

Conference & AGM 2020 in Warsaw, Poland (Online) 
The Eurodoc 2020 conference took place on July 22-23, 2020. It was the first online Eurodoc Conference in history. Due to the epidemic, organisers were obliged to change the date and form of the conference. The event was organised by Krajowa Reprezentacja Doktorantów (KRD) and Eurodoc with the financial support of the Ministry of Science and Higher Education Republic of Poland. The topic of the conference was "Open Up Your Science!"

Members and observers
There are 29 member organisations representing young researchers from 26 countries of the European Union and the Council of Europe. These are the members which conduct Eurodoc's decisions. In addition, contributions to Eurodoc's activities also include observers as national representatives.

Objectives
Eurodoc envisions a European Research Area and European Higher Education Area in which doctoral candidates and junior researchers are duly recognised and respected for the essential roles they play in the research community. Eurodoc seeks to represent and consolidate the community of doctoral candidates and junior researchers in Europe in their pursuit of a dignified career and a worthy professional life.

As a volunteer, non-profit organisation, Eurodoc monitors the situation of early career researchers in Europe with respect to different parameters (e.g. mobility, working conditions, employment opportunities, career paths, doctoral supervision and training).

Eurodoc issues policy statements and provides recommendations to academic, corporate and governing institutions on subjects of special relevance to European doctoral candidates and junior researchers (e.g., the Bologna Process or the Lisbon Strategy). In this activity, Eurodoc is in regular contact with major stakeholders in European research and higher education policy, most notably with the Directorate-General for Research (European Commission), and the European University Association.

The first Eurodoc Survey was conducted from December 2008 until May 2011. It analysed the current situation of 7561 doctoral candidates in twelve countries (Austria, Belgium, Hungary, Finland, France, Germany, the Netherlands, Norway, Portugal, Slovenia, Spain and Sweden), and provided input for policy recommendations at the European level.

See also
 European Higher Education Area
 European Charter for Researchers
 World Association of Young Scientists
 Actionuni, the Swiss Researchers Association

References

External links
 
 Karen Stroobants. You can help to create a new researcher-reward system. Nature Career Column, 04 May 2021. https://doi.org/10.1038/d41586-021-01208-3
 Open Research Europe to be launched in 2021. EURAXESS, 24 July 2020. euraxess.ec.europa.eu
 Eurodoc and Science Next Wave, 2005. The Eurodoc Exchange: sharing a vision for the future of research in Europe. web.archive.org
 Urani, A., Tan, R., Rubele, R. et al. Giving young European students a voice. Nature 427, 378 (2004). https://doi.org/10.1038/nj6972-378b

Higher education organisations based in Europe
Organizations established in 2005
Professional associations based in Belgium
Pan-European trade and professional organizations